The 1990 Pop Cola Sizzlers season was the 1st season of the franchise in the Philippine Basketball Association (PBA). The team change its name to Sarsi in the Third Conference.

Expansion pool

Draft picks

New ballclub
RFM Corporation, which brought the Cosmos Bottling, Inc. was one of the two newcomers that joined the PBA as the league enters its 16th season. The team will be known as Pop Cola Sizzlers. Their first official game shown on TV took place in the RP-China goodwill series in the first week of February, featuring a Chinese Selection going up against PBA teams in exhibition games held at the Ninoy Aquino Stadium. Pop Cola paraded an import named Willie Glass and lost to the powerhouse Chinese quintet, 73-93.  Glass was sent home before the season started. 

The Sizzlers played All-Filipino in their opening game against fellow expansion team and softdrink rival Pepsi Cola when their choice for an import, Fennis Dembo, backed out at the last minute, Pop Cola lost to the Pepsi Hotshots, 130-149.

Notable dates
March 13: Winless in five outings, Pop Cola finally scored their first victory in the pro league by beating Purefoods Hotdogs, 138-120. 

June 10: Pop Cola scored a surprising 131-121 win over Alaska Milkmen at the start of the All-Filipino Conference.  

October 2: Bannered by NBA veteran Lewis Lloyd, along with Michael Anderson as their imports. The Sizzlers defeated reigning All-Filipino Champion Presto Tivolis, 141-138, in their first game in the Third Conference. 

November 6: Sarsi advances in the semifinal round with five wins and five loss record, defeating Purefoods Hotdogs, 148-143, as Lloyd and Anderson scored 59 and 56 points respectively for a combined 115-point output of the two imports.  

November 13: The Sizzlers rallied to beat Alaska Milkmen, 123-120, in their second outing in the semifinals.   

December 2: The Sarsi Sizzlers ended the year on a high note, denying corporate rival Purefoods Hotdogs a finals seat with a 138-131 victory.

Roster

Transactions

Additions

Recruited imports

References

Pop Cola Panthers seasons
Pop